The Marokopa River is a river of the Waikato Region of New Zealand. It flows west to join the Tasman Sea at Marokopa.

Near Te Anga, the river flows over the picturesque Marokopa Falls. The settlements of Awamarino and Marokopa are located on the river's banks.

Trout were introduced about 1910. The lower river is polluted.

See also
List of rivers of New Zealand

References

Rivers of Waikato
Waitomo District
Rivers of New Zealand